The 1995 NAIA Division I women's basketball tournament was the tournament held by the NAIA to determine the national champion of women's college basketball among its Division I members in the United States and Canada for the 1994–95 basketball season.

Top-seeded defending champions Southern Nazarene defeated Southeastern Oklahoma State in the championship game, 78–77, to claim the Redskins' third NAIA national title. This would ultimately be the second of four consecutive championships for Southern Nazarene. 

The tournament was played at the Oman Arena in Jackson, Tennessee.

Qualification

The tournament field remained fixed at thirty-two teams, with the top sixteen teams receiving seeds. 

The tournament continued to utilize a simple single-elimination format.

Bracket

See also
1995 NAIA Division I men's basketball tournament
1995 NCAA Division I women's basketball tournament
1995 NCAA Division II women's basketball tournament
1995 NCAA Division III women's basketball tournament
1995 NAIA Division II women's basketball tournament

References

NAIA
NAIA Women's Basketball Championships
1995 in sports in Tennessee